Alexey Korolev (born June 20, 1987) is a Kazakhstani ski jumper who has competed since 2004. Competing in two Winter Olympics, he earned his best finish of 12th in the team large hill event at Turin in 2006 while earning his best finish of 39th in the individual large hill event at Vancouver four years later.

At the FIS Nordic World Ski Championships 2009 in Liberec, Korolov finished 12th in the team large hill and 46th in the individual normal hill event.

His best World Cup finish was eighth in the team large hill event at Germany in 2009 while his best individual finish was 29th in an individual large hill event at Germany the following year.

References 
 

1987 births
Kazakhstani male ski jumpers
Living people
Olympic ski jumpers of Kazakhstan
Ski jumpers at the 2006 Winter Olympics
Ski jumpers at the 2010 Winter Olympics
Sportspeople from Almaty
Asian Games medalists in ski jumping
Ski jumpers at the 2011 Asian Winter Games
Asian Games silver medalists for Kazakhstan
Medalists at the 2011 Asian Winter Games